Dryopteris nigropaleacea is a species of perennial leptosporangiate fern endemic to parts of Afghanistan, Pakistan, western Nepal, and Himachal Pradesh and Uttar Pradesh in India.

Synonyms
 Dryopteris juxtaposita subsp. nigropaleacea (Fraser-Jenk.) Khullar
 Dryopteris pallida subsp. nigropaleacea Fraser-Jenk.

External links

nigropaleacea